The Fort Union Formation is a geologic unit containing sandstones, shales, and coal beds in Wyoming, Montana, and parts of adjacent states. In the Powder River Basin, it contains important economic deposits of coal, uranium, and coalbed methane.

Description 
The Fort Union is mostly of Paleocene age and represents a time of extensive swamps as well as fluvial and lacustrine conditions. The rocks are more sandy in southwestern Wyoming and more coal-bearing in northeast Wyoming and southeast Montana, reflecting a general change from rivers and lakes in the west to swamps in the east, but all three environments were present at various times in most locations.

Coal in the Fort Union in the Powder River Basin occurs mainly in the Tongue River Member, where as many as 32 coal seams total more than 300 feet in thickness. Most of the coals in the Fort Union Formation are ranked subbituminous.

Fossil content

Mammals

Cimolestans

Leptictids

Marsupials

Primatomorphs

Ungulates

Reptiles

Birds
A partial ornithurine coracoid bone found in this formation is identical to others found in the older Hell Creek Formation. At present, this unnamed species is the only known individual bird species that have survived the Cretaceous–Paleogene extinction event.

Crocodilians

Squamates

Testudines

Amphibians

Fish

Invertebrates

Bivalves

Gastropods

Plants

See also 
 List of fossiliferous stratigraphic units in Colorado
 List of fossiliferous stratigraphic units in Montana
 List of fossiliferous stratigraphic units in North Dakota
 List of fossiliferous stratigraphic units in Wyoming
 Uranium mining in Wyoming
 Guaduas Formation, contemporaneous coal-bearing formation of northern South America

References 

Geologic formations of Montana
Geologic formations of North Dakota
Geologic formations of Wyoming
Cretaceous Montana
Cretaceous geology of North Dakota
Cretaceous geology of Wyoming
Paleogene Montana
Paleogene geology of North Dakota
Paleogene geology of Wyoming
Maastrichtian Stage of North America
Danian Stage
Cretaceous–Paleogene boundary
Clarkforkian
Lancian
Puercan
Tiffanian
Torrejonian
Paleontology in Wyoming
Fluvial deposits
Lacustrine deposits
Sandstone formations of the United States
Shale formations of the United States
Coal formations
Coal in the United States